Galactosomum is a genus of flukes in the family Heterophyidae. There are currently 28 recognised species within the genus. They mainly infect aquatic birds, but often infest fish as larvae. Three species are known to use marine mammals as hosts.

Description
The excised spherical metacercaria is 2.7–4.9 mm long. Generally, only one is found per fish.

Life cycle
Some species of Galactosomum  cause infected fish to swim closer to the surface and colorfully flash their underbellies. In fish, symptoms can be similar to those of whirling disease caused by the unrelated parasite Myxobolus cerebralis.  Gastropods hosting select species suffer from sensory impairment due to infestation. This makes these prey animals more likely to be consumed by aquatic birds, providing a host for the parasite to reach the mature stage of its life cycle. Galactosomum cannot survive in human hosts.

Species
Galactosomum baylisi (Gohar, 1930)
Galactosomum bearupi Pearson, 1973
Galactosomum cochlear (Diesing, 1850) Travassos, 1929
Galactosomum cochleariforme (Rudolphi, 1819) Pratt, 1911
Galactosomum darbyi Price, 1934
Galactosomum dollfusi Pearson, 1973
Galactosomum echinatum (Timon-David, 1955)
Galactosomum erinaceum (Poirier, 1886)
Galactosomum fregatae (Prudhoe, 1949)
Galactosomum humbargari Park, 1936
Galactosomum johnsoni (Price, 1934)
Galactosomum lacteum (Jägerskiöld, 1896)
Galactosomum linguiforme Anantaraman, 1974
Galactosomum nicolai (Isaichikov, 1927)
Galactosomum palawanense Fischthal & Kuntz, 1972
Galactosomum phalacrocoracis Yamaguti, 1939
Galactosomum puffini Yamaguti, 1941
Galactosomum renincola Pearson, 1973
Galactosomum sanaense Kobayashi, 1942
Galactosomum semifuscum (Olsson, 1876)
Galactosomum sinuilactis Pearson, 1973
Galactosomum spinetum (Braun, 1901)
Galactosomum stelleri Dailey, Demaree & Critchfield, 2002
Galactosomum timondavidi Pearson & Prévot, 1971
Galactosomum ubelakeri (Dailey, 1969) Pearson, 1977
Galactosomum ussuriense Oshmarin, 1963
Galactosomum witenbergi Anantaraman, 1974
Galactosomum yehi (Dissanaike, 1961) Pearson, 1973

References

External links

Heterophyidae
Suicide-inducing parasitism